St. Mary Staining was a parish church in Oat Lane, northeast of St. Paul's Cathedral, in the City of London. First recorded in the 12th century, it was destroyed in the Great Fire of London in 1666 and not rebuilt.

History
The first reference to it is to "Ecclesia de Staningehage" in 1189, probably deriving from a family from Staines holding land in the area of the church. It was destroyed in the Great Fire of London in 1666 and not rebuilt. Its parish was united to St. Michael Wood Street in 1670,  and later to St. Alban Wood Street in 1894, and finally St. Vedast Foster Lane in 1954.

Nikolaus Pevsner found a "few battered tombstones" in  nearby Oat Lane. Since 1965 its site has been a City of London Corporation garden, containing a historic tree; an adjacent office block was built semi-circular so as not to damage it.

Notes

External links

12th-century church buildings in England
1666 disestablishments in England
Churches in the City of London
Churches destroyed in the Great Fire of London and not rebuilt
Former buildings and structures in the City of London